Kaija Marja Rahola (beginning in 1941 Lampela, 22 March 1920, Tampere − 24 July 1962) was a Finnish actress. She is best remembered for her role as Ringa Littow in a Valentin Vaala film Linnaisten vihreä kamari (1945).

Selected filmography

 Vihreä kulta (1939)
 Jumalan myrsky (1940)
 Kirkastettu sydän (1943)
 Linnaisten vihreä kamari (1945)
 Vastaus (1952)

References

External links 
 

1920 births
1962 deaths
Actresses from Tampere
Finnish film actresses
20th-century Finnish actresses